Multidentia is a genus of flowering plants in the family Rubiaceae.

Distribution
Multidentia is restricted to tropical Africa with the greatest concentration of species occurring in eastern Africa.

Taxonomy
It was originally described by Alexander von Gilli in 1973 to accommodate a single specimen of a suffruticose pyrophyte with ternate leaves. The type species was Multidentia verticillata - named after its verticillate leaves - but has been made synonym with Multidentia concrescens.

Species

 Multidentia castaneae (Robyns) Bridson & Verdc.
 Multidentia concrescens, (Bullock) Bridson & Verdc.
 Multidentia crassa (Hiern) Bridson & Verdc.
 Multidentia dichrophylla (Mildbr.) Bridson
 Multidentia exserta Bridson
 Multidentia fanshawei (Tennant) Bridson
 Multidentia kingupirensis Bridson
 Multidentia pobeguinii (Hutch. & Dalziel) Bridson
 Multidentia saxicola O.Lachenaud & Séné
 Multidentia sclerocarpa (K.Schum.) Bridson

References

External links 
 World Checklist of Rubiaceae

 
Rubiaceae genera
Taxonomy articles created by Polbot